Maurice Binder (December 4, 1918 – April 9, 1991) was an American film title designer best known for his work on 16 James Bond films including the first, Dr. No (1962), and for Stanley Donen's films from 1958.

Early work 
He was born in New York City, but mostly worked in Britain from the 1950s onwards. In 1951, Binder directed two short films in the obscure Meet Mister Baby series; these films were preserved by the Academy Film Archive in 2015. He did his first film title design for Stanley Donen's Indiscreet (1958). The Bond producers first approached him after being impressed by his title designs for the Donen comedy film The Grass Is Greener  (1960). Binder also provided sequences for Donen for Charade (1963) and Arabesque (1966), both accompanying music by Henry Mancini.

James Bond 
Binder created the signature gun barrel sequence for the opening titles of the first Bond film, Dr. No (1962). Binder originally planned to employ a camera sighted down the barrel of a .38 calibre gun, but this caused some problems. Unable to stop down the lens of a standard camera enough to bring the entire gun barrel into focus, his assistant Trevor Bond created a pinhole camera to solve the problem and the barrel became crystal clear.

Binder described the genesis of the gun-barrel sequence in the last interview he recorded before he died in 1991:

At least one critic has also observed that the sequence recalls the gun fired at the audience at the end of The Great Train Robbery (1903). Binder is also known for featuring women performing a variety of activities such as dancing, jumping on a trampoline, or shooting weapons in his work. Both sequences are trademarks and staples of the James Bond films. Maurice Binder was succeeded by Daniel Kleinman as the title designer for GoldenEye (1995).

Prior to GoldenEye, the only James Bond movies for which he did not create the opening title credits were From Russia with Love (1963) and Goldfinger (1964), both of which were designed by Robert Brownjohn.

Other sequences 
Binder shot opening and closing sequences involving a mouse (an animal that did not appear in either the novel or the film) for The Mouse That Roared (1959), a sequence of monks filmed as a mosaic explaining the history of the Golden Bell in The Long Ships (1963), and a sequence of Spanish dancers explaining why the then topical reference of nuclear weapons vanishing in a B-52 mishap shifted from Spain to Greece in The Day the Fish Came Out (1967).

He designed the title sequence for Sodom and Gomorrah (1963) that featured an orgy (the only one in the film). He took three days to direct the sequence that was originally supposed to take one day.

Binder also was a producer of The Passage (1979), and a visual consultant on Dracula (1979) and Oxford Blues (1984).

Death 
Binder died from lung cancer in London, aged 72.

Filmography

James Bond 
 Dr. No (1962)
 From Russia with Love — gun barrel sequence only (reused from Dr. No) (1963)
 Goldfinger — gun barrel sequence only (reused from Dr. No) (1964)
 Thunderball (1965)
 You Only Live Twice (1967)
 On Her Majesty's Secret Service (1969)
 Diamonds Are Forever (1971)
 Live and Let Die (1973)
 The Man with the Golden Gun (1974)
 The Spy Who Loved Me (1977)
 Moonraker (1979)
 For Your Eyes Only (1981)
 Octopussy (1983)
 A View to a Kill (1985)
 The Living Daylights (1987)
 Licence to Kill (1989)

Selected other films 
 Indiscreet (1958)
 The Mouse That Roared (1959)
 Once More, with Feeling! (1960)
 Purple Noon (1960)
 The Grass Is Greener (1960)
 Road to Hong Kong (1962)
 Reach for Glory (1962)
 Charade (1963)
 Call Me Bwana (1963)
 The Running Man (1963)
 The Mouse on the Moon (1963)
 The Long Ships (1963)
 The 7th Dawn (1964)
 The Chase (1966)
 Caccia alla volpe (After the Fox) (1966)
 Arabesque (1966)
 Kaleidoscope (1966)
 Bedazzled (1967)
 Fathom (1967)
 Billion Dollar Brain (1967)  
 Two for the Road (1967)
 Barbarella (1968)
 Battle of Britain (1969)
 The Private Life of Sherlock Holmes (1970)
 Young Winston (1972)
 Gold (1974)
 The Tamarind Seed (1974) 
 Shout at the Devil (1976)
 The Wild Geese (1978)
 Dracula (1979)
 The Sea Wolves (1980)
 The Final Countdown (1980)
 Green Ice (1981)
 Max, Mon Amour (1986)
 The Last Emperor (1987)
 The Sheltering Sky (1990)

References

External links 
 
 Maurice Binder at Art of the Title

1918 births
1991 deaths
Artists from New York City
Deaths from lung cancer in England
Film and television title designers